Michael A. McGlinchey (December 28, 1944 – March 24, 1997) was an American football coach.  He served as the head football coach at Salisbury University, Central Connecticut State University, and Frostburg State University, compiling a career college football record of 91–49–6.

McGlinchey was born in Richland, Washington and attended Newark High School in Newark, Delaware.  At the University of Delaware, he competed in football, baseball, and wrestling. McGlinchey died of amyotrophic lateral sclerosis, at his home in Salisbury, Maryland,  on March 24, 1997.

Coaching career
McGlinchey was the ninth head football coach at Frostburg State University in Frostburg, Maryland and he held that position for four seasons, from 1992 until 1995.  His coaching record at Frostburg was 30–11–2.

Head coaching record

References

External links
 

1944 births
1997 deaths
American football defensive backs
Central Connecticut Blue Devils football coaches
Delaware Fightin' Blue Hens baseball players
Delaware Fightin' Blue Hens football players
Delaware Fightin' Blue Hens wrestlers
Frostburg State Bobcats football coaches
Salisbury Sea Gulls football coaches
College wrestling coaches in the United States
People from Newark, Delaware
People from Richland, Washington
Coaches of American football from Delaware
Players of American football from Delaware
Baseball players from Delaware
Neurological disease deaths in Maryland
Deaths from motor neuron disease